Edulabad Lake is a lake located near Ghatkeser, Hyderabad. It is also known as Edulabad water reservoir. Industrial sewage and waste from Patancheru have polluted this lake, killing fish and causing illness in lakeside communities in 2002. The lake has turned pink in color due to the chemicals in the sewage industries.

References

Lakes of Hyderabad, India